Banjë Hydro Power Plant is a large hydroelectricity plant on the river Devoll situated near the village of Banjë, Albania. It was built by Devoll Hydropower, an Albanian company owned by Norwegian power company Statkraft. The project consists of a large power plant with a nominal capacity of 70 MW and an average annual production of 242 GWh. The dam is 900 m long, 370 m wide and 80 m high. The reservoir was planned to have a surface area of 14 km2, and a storage capacity of about 400 million m3. It was completed in 2016.

References

Hydroelectric power stations in Albania
Cërrik